Abdelkrim Latrèche (born 2 September 1957) is an Algerian football manager.

References

1957 births
Living people
Algerian football managers
CA Bordj Bou Arréridj managers
USM Annaba managers
CRB Aïn Fakroun managers
MC El Eulma managers
USM Blida managers
RC Relizane managers
MO Béjaïa managers
NC Magra managers
21st-century Algerian people